Melanella is a genus of very small ectoparasitic sea snails, marine gastropod mollusks or micromollusks in the family Eulimidae.

Species
According to the World Register of Marine Species (WoRMS) the following species are recognised in the genus Melanella

Melanella abida 
Melanella acanthyllis 
Melanella acicula 
Melanella aciculata 
Melanella acuformis 
Melanella adamantina 
Melanella adiastalta 
Melanella aequatorialis 
Melanella aethiopica 
Melanella aethria 
Melanella agulhasensis 
Melanella alba 
Melanella alertae 
Melanella alfredensis 
Melanella algoensis 
Melanella amabilis 
Melanella amblia 
Melanella amblytera 
Melanella ameliae 
Melanella anachorea 
Melanella anapetes 
Melanella antarctica 
Melanella archeyi 
Melanella arenularia 
Melanella arleyi 
Melanella atlantica 
Melanella attenuata 
Melanella aucklandica 
Melanella augur 
Melanella badenia 
Melanella baldra 
Melanella becki 
Melanella bipartita 
Melanella borealis 
Melanella boscheineni 
Melanella boscii 
Melanella bovicornu 
Melanella breviuscula 
Melanella brunnimaculata 
Melanella bryani 
Melanella callistemma 
Melanella candida 
Melanella catalinensis 
Melanella chariessa 
Melanella chydaea 
Melanella cifara 
Melanella clavula 
Melanella collator 
Melanella compactilis 
Melanella conoidalis 
Melanella conoidea 
Melanella convexa 
Melanella corintonis 
Melanella cosmia 
Melanella costellata 
Melanella cumingii 
Melanella cunaeformis 
Melanella cuspidata 
Melanella cyclopia 
Melanella cylindrica 
Melanella debilis 
Melanella decagyra 
Melanella decipiens 
Melanella densicostata 
Melanella distorta 
Melanella doederleini 
Melanella draconis 
Melanella dubusi 
Melanella dufresnii 
Melanella eburnea 
Melanella elenensis 
Melanella elsa 
Melanella eulimoides 
Melanella exasperata 
Melanella exilis 
Melanella exulata 
Melanella falcata 
Melanella fasciata 
Melanella flexuosa 
Melanella frielei 
Melanella gagei 
Melanella geoffreyi 
Melanella glypta 
Melanella gracilis 
Melanella gradata 
Melanella grandis 
Melanella gratiosa 
Melanella grippi 
Melanella guenteri 
Melanella hadalis 
Melanella halia 
Melanella halorhaphe 
Melanella hastata 
Melanella hebes 
Melanella hemphilli 
Melanella hians 
Melanella hypsela 
Melanella ima 
Melanella indica 
Melanella insculpta 
Melanella iotoides 
Melanella ira 
Melanella jeffreysii 
Melanella jucunda 
Melanella junieri 
Melanella kaiparaensis 
Melanella kanaka 
Melanella karolinae 
Melanella kermadecensis 
Melanella kuronamako 
Melanella lactea 
Melanella lastra 
Melanella laurae 
Melanella lautoides 
Melanella letsonae 
Melanella levantina 
Melanella lubrica 
Melanella luchuana 
Melanella lucida 
Melanella luminosa 
Melanella lunata 
Melanella magnifica 
Melanella major 
Melanella mamilla 
Melanella maoria 
Melanella martinii 
Melanella martynjordani 
Melanella marviva 
Melanella maui 
Melanella micans 
Melanella microsculpta 
Melanella mimus 
Melanella minor 
Melanella modesta 
Melanella modesta 
Melanella montereyensis 
Melanella monterosatoi 
Melanella muelleriae 
Melanella mundula 
Melanella myriotrochi 
Melanella nilae 
Melanella nisonida 
Melanella obtusa 
Melanella obtusoapicata 
Melanella ochsneri 
Melanella odontoidea 
Melanella ogasawarana 
Melanella oldroydae 
Melanella oleacea 
Melanella olssoni 
Melanella opaca 
Melanella opalina 
Melanella ophiodon 
Melanella orientalis 
Melanella orphanensis 
Melanella orthophyes 
Melanella otagoensis 
Melanella oxyacme 
Melanella oxytata 
Melanella pandata 
Melanella paraabida 
Melanella parallela 
Melanella parviapertura 
Melanella patutahiensis 
Melanella paxillus 
Melanella peninsularis 
Melanella penna 
Melanella pepediazi 
Melanella perplexa 
Melanella persimilis 
Melanella petitiana 
Melanella pisinna 
Melanella planisutis 
Melanella plioiberica 
Melanella polita 
Melanella polygyra 
Melanella pontilis 
Melanella praecurta 
Melanella producta 
Melanella pseudoglabra 
Melanella puhana 
Melanella reticulata 
Melanella retrorsa 
Melanella retusa 
Melanella richardi 
Melanella robusta 
Melanella roegerae 
Melanella salvadori 
Melanella sankurieae 
Melanella sansibarica 
Melanella sarissa 
Melanella scarifata 
Melanella seguenzai 
Melanella shibana 
Melanella siberutensis 
Melanella similior 
Melanella similis 
Melanella solida 
Melanella solidula 
Melanella soliduloides 
Melanella solitaria 
Melanella sororcula 
Melanella sowerbyi 
Melanella spina 
Melanella spinosa 
Melanella spiridioni 
Melanella stalioi 
Melanella stamina 
Melanella subantarctica 
Melanella subemarginata 
Melanella subula 
Melanella sulculata 
Melanella tanabensis 
Melanella teinostoma 
Melanella teramachii 
Melanella thalia 
Melanella thersites 
Melanella tia 
Melanella tortuosa 
Melanella townsendi 
Melanella translucens 
Melanella trunca 
Melanella truncata 
Melanella turbonilloides 
Melanella turrita 
Melanella tutamoensis 
Melanella variabilis 
Melanella vegrandis 
Melanella versa 
Melanella waiaotea 
Melanella waikomitica 
Melanella wareni 
Melanella yamazii 
Melanella zugnigae 

The Indo-Pacific Molluscan Database also includes the following species with names in current use

 Melanella australiensis (Thiele, 1930)
 Melanella campyla (Watson, 1883)
 Melanella carneola (Gould, 1861 in 1859–61)
 Melanella curvata (A. Adams, 1861-b)
 Melanella dentaliopsis (A. Adams, 1861-b)
 Melanella flexa (A. Adams, 1861-b)
 Melanella labiosa (Sowerby II, 1834-b)
 Melanella musta (Yokoyama, 1928)
 Melanella nivea (A. Adams, 1861): species inquirenda
 Melanella oblonga (Boettger)
 Melanella pinguicula (A. Adams, 1861)
 Melanella reclinata (A. Adams, 1861)
 Melanella scitula (A. Adams, 1861-b)
 Melanella semitorta (A. Adams, 1861-b)
 Melanella stenostoma (A. Adams, 1861-b)
 Melanella stylata (A. Adams, 1861-b)
 Melanella valida (A. Adams, 1861-b)
 Melanella venusta (Pease, 1868-b)

References

 Leach, 1847 [in Gray] Annals and Magazine of Natural History, 20: 271; Placed on the Official List by Opinion 1739, 1993, Bulletin of Zoological Nomenclature, 50(3): 242
 Warén A. (1984) A generic revision of the family Eulimidae (Gastropoda, Prosobranchia). Journal of Molluscan Studies suppl. 13: 1–96. page(s): 54
 Gofas, S.; Le Renard, J.; Bouchet, P. (2001). Mollusca, in: Costello, M.J. et al. (Ed.) (2001). European register of marine species: a check-list of the marine species in Europe and a bibliography of guides to their identification. Collection Patrimoines Naturels, 50: pp. 180–213

External links
 Bowdich, T.E. 1822. Elements of Conchology, including the fossil genera and animals. Part 1. Univalves. Paris : Smith pp. i–xi, 14–73, index 1–3, 19 pls, 2 tables
  Gray, J. E. (1847). A list of the genera of recent Mollusca, their synonyma and types. Proceedings of the Zoological Society of London. (1847) 15: 129-219
 Laseron, C. 1955. Revision of the New South Wales eulimoid shells. The Australian Zoologist 12(2): 83–107, pls 1–3, figs 1–78 [85–86, 101] [Euliamaustra is an alternative original spelling (p. 85); spelling Eulimaustra selected by First Reviser action by McMichael & Whitley, 1961, The Marine Zoologist, 1(8): 124]
  Serge GOFAS, Ángel A. LUQUE, Joan Daniel OLIVER,José TEMPLADO & Alberto SERRA (2021) - The Mollusca of Galicia Bank (NE Atlantic Ocean); European Journal of Taxonomy 785: 1–114

 

Gastropod genera
Taxa named by Thomas Edward Bowdich